André Pean is a retired French slalom canoeist who competed from the late 1940s to the early 1950s. He won two medals at the 1951 ICF Canoe Slalom World Championships in Steyr with a gold in the C-2 team event and a silver in the C-2 event.

References
ICF medalists for Olympic and World Championships - Part 2: rest of flatwater (now sprint) and remaining canoeing disciplines: 1936-2007.

French male canoeists
Living people
Year of birth missing (living people)
Medalists at the ICF Canoe Slalom World Championships